The 1905–06 season is the 32nd season of competitive football by Rangers.

Overview
Rangers played a total of 33 competitive matches during the 1905–06 season. The side finished fourth in the league, twelve points behind champions Celtic, despite only collecting one win from the final six matches.

The Scottish Cup campaign began at Arthurlie then Aberdeen before the side were knocked out away to Port Glasgow Athletic.

Results
All results are written with Rangers' score first.

Scottish League Division One

Scottish Cup

Appearances

 Source: Fitbastats

See also
 1905–06 in Scottish football
 1905–06 Scottish Cup

Rangers F.C. seasons
Rangers